Roy Faulkner (born 28 June 1935) is an English former footballer who played as an inside forward in the Football League for Manchester City and Walsall.

Honours
with Walsall
 Football League Fourth Division champion: 1959–60

References

1935 births
Living people
Footballers from Manchester
English footballers
Association football inside forwards
Manchester City F.C. players
Walsall F.C. players
Telford United F.C. players
English Football League players